Jaws is an album by saxophonist Eddie "Lockjaw" Davis with organist Shirley Scott, recorded in 1958 for the Prestige label.

Reception
The AllMusic review awarded the album 3 stars and stated: "It's a fine all-around showcase for the accessible group."

Track listing 
 "I Let a Song Go Out of My Heart" (Duke Ellington, Irving Mills, Henry Nemo, John Redmond) - 5:19   
 "I'll Never Be The Same" (Gus Kahn, Matty Malneck, Frank Signorelli) - 4:44   
 "You Stepped Out of a Dream" (Nacio Herb Brown, Kahn) - 4:20   
 "Old Devil Moon" (E. Y. "Yip" Harburg, Burton Lane) - 4:26   
 "Too Close for Comfort" (Jerry Bock, Larry Holofcener, George David Weiss) -  4:18   
 "Body and Soul" (Frank Eyton, Johnny Green, Edward Heyman, Robert Sour) - 4:32   
 "But Not for Me" (George Gershwin, Ira Gershwin) - 4:10   
 "Tangerine" (Johnny Mercer, Victor Schertzinger) - 4:53

Personnel 
 Eddie "Lockjaw" Davis - tenor saxophone
 Shirley Scott - organ
 George Duvivier - bass
 Arthur Edgehill - drums

References 

Eddie "Lockjaw" Davis albums
1959 albums
Albums produced by Esmond Edwards
Albums recorded at Van Gelder Studio
Prestige Records albums
Shirley Scott albums